A kosher certification agency is an organization or certifying authority that grants a hechsher ("seal of approval") to ingredients, packaged foods, beverages, and certain materials, as well as food-service providers and facilities in which kosher food is prepared or served. This certification verifies that the ingredients, production process including all machinery, and/or food-service process complies with the standards of kashrut (Jewish dietary law) as stipulated in the Shulchan Arukh, the benchmark of religious Jewish law. The certification agency employs mashgichim (rabbinic field representatives) to make periodic site visits and oversee the food-production or food-service process in order to verify ongoing compliance. Each agency has its own trademarked symbol that it allows manufacturers and food-service providers to display on their products or in-store certificates; use of this symbol can be revoked for non-compliance. Each agency typically has a "certifying rabbi" (Rav Hamachshir) who determines the exact kashrut standards to be applied and oversees their implementation.

A kosher certification agency's purview extends only to those areas mandated by Jewish law. Kosher certification is not a substitute for government or private food safety testing and enforcement.

Scope

As of 2014, there are more than 1,100 kosher certification agencies. These include international, national, regional, Israeli, specialty, and non-Orthodox agencies. Specialty agencies endorse ethical business practices, animal welfare, and environmental awareness on the part of the food producer. Non-Orthodox agencies accept leniences in certain aspects of food production and business operation (such as operating on Shabbat) that Orthodox agencies do not.

Agencies 
The largest kosher certification agencies in the United States, known as the "Big Five", certify more than 80% of the kosher food sold in the US. These five agencies are: the OU, OK, KOF-K, Star-K, and CRC.

While the OU, OK, Kof-K, and Star-K have deep international reach, there are kosher agencies on all six habitable continents. Particularly prominent among the various international kosher supervisors are the London Beit Din, the Kashrus Council of Canada, Kosher Australia, and Rabbi Mordechai Rottenberg. MK Kosher is the leader in Kosher Certification in Canada. MK Kosher is a leading kosher certification agency providing kosher certication for over 75,000 products worldwide.

History
Before the advent of industrially-produced foods, Jewish families prepared their own meals at home and ensured the kashrut of raw ingredients themselves by taking chicken and meat to be slaughtered by a reliable shochet and ensuring that milking was supervised by a Jew. In the kitchen, the housewife observed the strict separation of milk and meat. It was only in the 20th century, with the increased availability of industrially-produced food products aimed at the Jewish consumer, that independent kosher certification became a necessity.

The first independent kosher certification agency, OU Kosher, was founded by the Orthodox Union (OU) in 1923. Its director, Abraham Goldstein, left OU Kosher to establish a second certification agency, OK Laboratories, in 1935. Kosher certification expanded in the 1930s as major brands such as Coca-Cola sought certification to expand their market. The proliferation of factory-produced foods following World War II saw a concomitant rise in kosher certification. In 1950, for example, the OU's staff of around 40 mashgichim (rabbinic field representatives) certified 184 products for 37 companies; by 1972, the OU had more than 750 mashgichim certifying over 2,500 products for 475 companies.

In the late 20th century, the increasing use of pre-processed ingredients – such as artificial flavorings, emulsifiers, and preservatives – further broadened the scope of kosher certification. A product produced in one country can contain ingredients and flavorings produced in other countries; these ingredients and flavorings must be tracked to their point of origin to verify their compliance with kashrut laws. According to a 2013 estimate, the 135,000 food products then certified kosher contained more than one million food additives. Certification agencies regularly send mashgichim to factories in China, Thailand, and the Philippines to oversee the production of pre-processed ingredients and ensure their kosher status. Many certification agencies accept the use of pre-processed ingredients that have been approved by other agencies.

Certification agencies may differ on the kosher status of foods based on the p'sak (halakhic ruling) of their rav hamakhshir (rabbinic authority). For example, aspartame, a key ingredient in Diet Coke, is considered to be kitniyot by the Kashruth Council of Canada (COR) and therefore that agency does not give its hechsher to that product for use on Passover. In contrast, the OU relies on poskim who rule that the additive is kitniyos shenishtanah–kitniyos that has been "changed at the molecular level" (and therefore is no longer kitniyos)–and therefore the OU gives its hechsher to Diet Coke for use on Passover.

What requires kosher certification

According to halakha (Jewish law), the following requires kosher supervision:
 Foods – including meat, poultry, fish, dairy products, fruits and vegetables, grains, beverages, and food additives 
 Production process 
 Food-service venues – such as restaurants, nursing homes, university dining rooms, hospitals, stadiums, convention halls. Even though the hot dogs sold in a certain venue are certified kosher, a mashgiach/mashgicha must be present to ensure that non-kosher food items do not come in contact with them, and that non-kosher foods are not sold or distributed in kosher wrappers.

Certification process

The certification process begins with a request for certification from the client.

Large food manufacturers generally seek certification from larger, national and international agencies, while small, local businesses receive certification from rabbis serving that community, or from individual rabbis who have a good reputation in the industry. Clients seeking Kosher certification are required to approach individual certifying agencies and endure the application process multiple times, before settling on a suitable agency. To reduce time and effort, the company may wish to contact a Kosher certification broker who will aim to find the best Kosher certifying agency suited to the product and budget. A noted Kosher certification broker is Direct Kosher.

The next step is for the client to supply a list of all ingredients used in its food product and machinery (such as cleaning agents), which the certification agency will research and trace back to their sources and suppliers to verify their kosher status. If the client later deviates from this list and brings other ingredients into its facility, the agency has the right to demand changes or terminate the contract.

Next, the agency's rabbinic representatives walk through the entire food production or food-service process with the client, noting equipment, production processes, packaging techniques, storage systems, and transportation arrangements that may compromise kosher status. If non-kosher food is being produced in the same plant (or if meat and dairy products are both being produced), the two systems must remain completely separate, including the avoidance of heat transfer by boilers servicing the two production lines. If non-kosher food is being produced on the same machinery as kosher food, albeit in separate runs, all equipment and utensils must be intensively cleaned and then treated with boiling water before being used for the kosher run. The client must also agree to specific documentation and record-keeping systems in order to track raw ingredients coming in and processed foods going out, as well as production schedules.

A food-service venue must comply with additional halakhic requirements, such as respecting the laws of Shabbat, Yom Tov, Passover, and certain Jewish fast days.

The agency and client sign a one-year contract which is renewed automatically, unless either party notifies the other of its desire to end the relationship.

Symbol

Upon approval, the client receives permission to display the kosher certification agency's symbol, or hechsher, on its product packaging or on a certificate displayed in its food-service venue. Each agency has its own symbol, usually a registered trademark, that is the property of the agency and can be used only with permission. If certification is withdrawn for any reason, the client must destroy any packaging bearing the agency's symbol, as well as remove the symbol from its advertisements.

Agencies are constantly on the lookout for fraudulent use of their symbol. Both agencies and consumer bulletins publicize the names of companies and products from which certification has been withdrawn. If a symbol is trademarked, unauthorized use is a federal crime in the United States.

In addition to the symbol, many agencies indicate whether the product is dairy ("D"), meaty ("Meat"), pareve ("Pareve"), or kosher for Passover ("P").

The letter "K" by itself cannot be trademarked, and therefore can be affixed to a product by anyone. It carries no legal or halakhic significance, and is therefore, with few exceptions, not a guarantee of kosher status.

Symbols of various kosher certification agencies

Role of the mashgichim

The mashgiach/mashgicha, or rabbinic field representative, is the kosher certification agency's "eyes and ears" at the point of production or distribution. They must ensure that kosher and non-kosher production runs are kept completely separate. They must be familiar with all ingredients and the way they are produced to ensure kosher status. Most large certification agencies maintain a database listing "hundreds of thousands of ingredients and formulas" to provide up-to-date information to their mashgichim.

The mashgiach/mashgicha makes frequent and unannounced site visits during a production run to ensure compliance with the terms of the contract. If they see something suspicious or have any questions about the ingredients or production process, they immediately contacts one of the agency's rabbinic coordinators, who is the decision-maker for issues of compliance and certification. For a food-service event, a mashgiach/mashgicha must be on hand at all times to ensure that kosher standards are enforced.

Fees
Kosher certification agencies charge different fees based on the services they provide. There is generally an annual fee for the certification itself, which takes into account the number and frequency of on-site inspections by mashgichim and related administrative costs. If the agency is for-profit, it may levy an annual fee as well as request a percentage of gross annual sales. The agency may also require a one-time "set-up fee", a per-shift fee for special production runs, and a fee for kashering equipment and utensils.

While critics contend that kosher certification raises the cost of the product to the consumer, the fees are absorbed into the client's regular operating costs. The client recoups the fee many times over due to the increased sales that result from kosher certification. However, the client may incur additional expense if it must make changes in its machinery or production process to accommodate the kosher certification.

Additional certifications
Some certification agencies, most notably EarthKosher Kosher Certification offer additional certifications such as Organic, Paleo, non-GMO, and/or Halal either as a standalone certification or in addition to kosher certification.

Other activities
In addition to kosher certification, the larger agencies engage in consumer education and industry advancement. Star-K, for example, operates a Kosher Hotline and produces a Passover Directory, Appliance Certification Directory, and a quarterly Kashrus Kurrents magazine. It also staffs an Institute of Halacha, Kashrus Training Programs, a Kashrus Foodservice Training Seminar, and Telekosher Conference Series Webinars.

References

Notes

Sources

 

 Jstor subscription

External links
OU Kosher Certification
Chicago Rabbinical Council
EarthKosher Kosher Certification
Kashrus Magazine
Kashrut.com
Badatz Kosher  (Spanish)
Direct Kosher (DK) Kosher certification
The Association of Kashrus Organizations
KosherQuest.org: Kosher Symbols
Orthodox Kosher Supervision India

Kashrut
 
Religious consumer symbols